Bagger 293, previously known as the MAN TAKRAF RB293, is a giant bucket-wheel excavator made by the German industrial company TAKRAF, formerly an East German Kombinat.

It owns and shares some records for terrestrial vehicle size in the Guinness Book of Records. Bagger 293 was built in 1995, one of a group of similar sized 'sibling' vehicles such as the Bagger 281 (built in 1958), Bagger 285 (1975), Bagger 287 (1976), Bagger 288 (1978), Bagger 291 (1993).

It is used in a brown coal mine near Hambach in Germany. It is called Bagger 293 by its current owner, RWE Power AG (the second-largest energy producer of Germany). It was called RB293 by its former owner, the brown coal company Rheinbraun, which in 1932 became a subsidiary of RWE. During an internal reshuffle in 2003 it merged with another daughter company to form RWE Power AG. Manufacturer TAKRAF generally refers to it as an excavator of the type SRs 8000.

Statistics
It is powered by an external power source providing 16.56 megawatts.

It can move  or 218,880 tonnes of soil per day (the same as Bagger 288).

See also 
 List of largest machines

References

External links

Softpedia.com
Tenova TAKRAF official website (Products: Mining Equipment: Bucket Wheel Excavators)

Bucket-wheel excavators
Coal mining in Germany
RWE
Buildings and structures in Rhein-Erft-Kreis
Economy of North Rhine-Westphalia
Takraf GmbH